Barbier v. Connolly, 113 U.S. 27 (1885), was a United States Supreme Court in which the Court considered the application of the Fourteenth Amendment to the United States Constitution to a San Francisco ordinance regulating the establishment of public laundries. The Court held that the regulation of laundries for public health and public safety reasons were clearly within the police powers of the state, and the Fourteenth Amendment was not meant to interfere with the police powers of the state.

External links 

United States Supreme Court cases
United States Supreme Court cases of the Waite Court
1885 in United States case law
United States equal protection case law
Legal history of San Francisco
Laundry organizations